Gauri Shankar (born 1 October 1992) is an Indian chess player who is currently a FIDE Master.

Gauri's older brother Arjun Vishnuvardhan is an International Chess Master and the 2006 National G/60 Chess Champion of the United States.

Achievements
 National Chess Champion of India for Under-7 boys 1999-2000, Aurangabad, India.
 2006 US Junior Open Chess Champion, Texas, United States.
 2007 Biel International Youth Chess Champion, Switzerland in August.

References

External links

Article on Chessbase.com

1992 births
Living people
Indian chess players
Chess FIDE Masters
Place of birth missing (living people)